Lirak Hasani (born 25 June 2002) is an English professional footballer who plays as a midfielder for Boston United, on loan from Gateshead.

Early and personal life
Born in Doncaster, Hasani is from Cantley. His parents are Kosovo Albanian.

Career
Hasani made his senior debut for Doncaster Rovers on 23 March 2019, in a 0–4 away league defeat at Luton Town, as a 72nd minute substitute for Aaron Lewis. Aged 16 at the time, he was voted Doncaster's 'Man of the Match' by the club's supporters, and was praised by manager Grant McCann for his performance.

On 7 January 2021, Hasani arrived at National League North side Gateshead on loan for the remainder of the 2020–21 season. In February 2021 he returned to Doncaster following the cancellation of the National League North.

On 11 August 2021, Hasani was loaned out to Matlock Town of the Northern Premier League Premier Division ahead of the 2021-22 season.

In February 2022 he joined Basford United on loan. 

Hasani was released by Doncaster at the end of the 2021–22 season.

Hasani signed a one-year deal with Gateshead on 5 August 2022. He moved on loan to Boston United in January 2023.

Career statistics

References

2002 births
Living people
English people of Kosovan descent
English people of Albanian descent
English footballers
Footballers from Doncaster
Doncaster Rovers F.C. players
Gateshead F.C. players
Matlock Town F.C. players
English Football League players
Association football midfielders
National League (English football) players
Northern Premier League players
Basford United F.C. players
Boston United F.C. players